Hemidactylus luqueorum is a species of house gecko endemic to Oman. The specific epithet luqueorum honors Maria Teresa Luque and her family.

References

Further reading
 Šmíd, Jiří, et al. "Out of Arabia: A complex biogeographic history of multiple vicariance and dispersal events in the gecko genus Hemidactylus (Reptilia: Gekkonidae)." (2013): e64018.

Hemidactylus
Reptiles of the Middle East
Reptiles described in 2012
Endemic fauna of Oman